The Chosen is a 2016 Spanish-Mexican thriller drama film written and directed by Antonio Chavarrías. The film stars Hannah Murray, Alfonso Herrera, Julian Sands and Henry Goodman. The movie was filmed in Coyoacán, Mexico and Barcelona, Spain, and its release was scheduled for the first part of 2016. The film is based on the murder of Leon Trotsky in 1940.

Cast 
Alfonso Herrera as Ramón Mercader
Hannah Murray as Sylvia Ageloff
Henry Goodman as Leon Trotsky
Julian Sands as Kotov
Frances Barber as Natalia
Emilio Echevarría as Coronel Salazar
Alejandro Calva as David Alfaro Siqueiros
Elvira Mínguez as Caridad del Río
Roger Casamajor as Carles Vidal
Luis Rosales as Conserje Montejo
Javier Godino as Costa
Alexander Holtmann as Sheldon

Reception 
The Chosen received a 40% fresh rating on the Rotten Tomatoes review aggregator website. Andrea G. Bermejo, film reviewer for the Spanish newspaper El Mundo, gave the film three out of five stars, praising the performances of Alfonso Herrera and Hannah Murray. The Hollywood Reporter's Jonathan Holland wrote that Chavarrias' script covered the historical information "clearly and simply, and without over-falsifying the historical events," but the main character, Ramon Mercader, was "less interesting and a far cry from Alain Delon’s chilling depiction in Joseph Losey’s flawed The Assassination of Trotsky." The World Socialist Web Site's David Walsh, on the other hand, compared The Chosen favorably to Losey's "cold, unpleasant work," and praised Chavarrias' historical research and the script's characterization of Mercader.

References

External links 

2016 films
2016 thriller drama films
Mexican thriller drama films
Spanish thriller drama films
2010s Spanish-language films
2010s English-language films
Cultural depictions of Leon Trotsky